Neptune Bewitched is a 1925 German silent comedy film directed by Willy Achsel and starring Erra Bognar, Julius Falkenstein, and Harry Grunwald.

The film's sets were designed by the art director Robert A. Dietrich.

Cast
In alphabetical order

References

Bibliography

External links

1925 films
Films of the Weimar Republic
Films directed by Willy Achsel
German silent feature films
UFA GmbH films
1926 comedy films
1926 films
German comedy films
German black-and-white films
1925 comedy films
Silent comedy films
1920s German films